Midwestern Gothic was an American literary magazine based in Ann Arbor, Michigan and Chicago, Illinois. Founded in 2010 by Robert James Russell and Jeff Pfaller, Midwestern Gothic published fiction, essays, poetry, and photography. 

In 2013, Midwestern Gothic expanded into a book division, MG Press. From 2014-2016, in partnership with the University of Michigan's Residential College, they hosted an annual literary festival called Voices of the Middle West 

Midwestern Gothic also ran frequent interviews with influential Midwestern authors and poets, such as Charles Baxter, Matt Bell, Marianne Boruch, Peter Ho Davies, Stuart Dybek, Alice Friman, V.V. Ganeshananthan, Thomas McGuane.

As of December 2021, Midwestern Gothic and MG Press closed permanently.

Midwestern Gothic (literary journal)

Midwestern Gothic published fiction, essays, poetry, and photography, and was dedicated to painting a portrait of the Midwestern United States by writers who lived there or who had just passed through.

It was also distinguished from many other literary magazines by actively seeking work from previously unpublished writers in addition to established ones. Published authors included Nick Arvin, Frank Bill, Aaron Burch, Bonnie Jo Campbell, Roxane Gay, Amorek Huey, Lindsay Hunter, Keith Taylor, Anne Valente, Jeff Vande Zande, Marcus Wicker.

Staff

 Co-Founder/Managing Editor: Robert James Russell
 Co-Founder/Managing Editor: Jeff Pfaller
 Poetry Editor: Christina Olson
 Digital Marketing Director: Allison Reck
 Assistant Editor: Lauren Crawford
 Assistant Editor: Giuliana Eggleston
 Assistant Editor: Rachel Hurwitz

MG Press

Founded in 2013, MG Press was an extension of the literary journal Midwestern Gothic, focusing on Midwestern authors and their work.

Books published

VanBaale, Kali. The Space Between (2018). ISBN 978-1-944850-09-8
Prushinskaya, Anna. A Woman Is a Woman Until She Is a Mother (2017). ISBN 978-1-944850-06-7
Lesmeister, Keith. We Could’ve Been Happy Here (2017). 
 Shonkwiler, Eric. 8th Street Power & Light (2016). 
 VanBaale, Kali. The Good Divide (2016). 
 McCarthy, John. Ghost County (2016). 
 Tell Me How It Was: An Anthology of Imagined Michigan Histories. (2015). 
 Babcock, Julie. Autoplay (2014). 
 Shonkwiler, Eric. Above All Men (2014). 
 Carpenter, Scott Dominic. This Jealous Earth: Stories'' (2013).

See also
List of literary magazines

References

External links
 Midwestern Gothic (official website)

2010 establishments in Michigan
2010 establishments in Illinois
Poetry magazines published in the United States
Magazines established in 2010
Magazines published in Michigan
Magazines published in Chicago
Mass media in Ann Arbor, Michigan